Aleksandar Rodić (born 26 December 1979) is a Slovenian professional footballer who plays for Itala San Marco.

Career
At the beginning of his career Rodić played in Serbia. He made 3 appearances for FK Proleter Zrenjanin in the 1999–2000 First League of FR Yugoslavia.

On transfer deadline day in January 2005, Rodić signed for English club Portsmouth, making his debut as an 81st-minute substitute for Patrik Berger in a 2–1 victory over Middlesbrough. However, he failed to hold down a regular place in the team and the following season (2005–06) he was loaned to Turkish club Kayserispor. Rodić was released in the summer of 2006 and was signed by Bulgarian club Litex Lovech to partner Milivoje Novaković, another Slovenian international and Litex attacker. He made 16 appearances in the league, managing 1 goal. After leaving the team, Rodić accused club owner Grisha Ganchev, manager Ljupko Petrović and the administrative personnel at the team of a lack of professionalism. In 2007, he moved to Interblock for 200,000 euros.
On 13 March 2009, Rodić was loaned out to Shanghai Shenhua of the Chinese Super League. In February 2010, he was loaned to another Chinese Super League club, Qingdao Jonoon.

International
Rodić played as a striker for Slovenian club Gorica, helping them to several league titles. His performances for the club earned him caps for the Slovenian national team. He made his debut against Czech Republic on 9 February 2005.

Personal life
Rodić was born in Bosanska Dubica, SFR Yugoslavia in Bosnian Serb family. His younger sister Bojana is handball player. He married Slovenian triple jumper Snežana Rodić.

Career statistics

International

International goals
Scores and results list Slovenia's goal tally first.

References

External links
Player profile at NZS 
Player profile at PrvaLiga 

1979 births
Living people
People from Dubica, Bosnia and Herzegovina
Bosnia and Herzegovina emigrants to Slovenia
Serbs of Bosnia and Herzegovina
Slovenian people of Serbian descent
Slovenian footballers
Slovenian expatriate sportspeople in England
Association football forwards
ND Gorica players
NK IB 1975 Ljubljana players
Expatriate footballers in England
Premier League players
Portsmouth F.C. players
First Professional Football League (Bulgaria) players
PFC Litex Lovech players
Shanghai Shenhua F.C. players
Qingdao Hainiu F.C. (1990) players
Chengdu Tiancheng F.C. players
Tianjin Tianhai F.C. players
Kayserispor footballers
Belgian Pro League players
Süper Lig players
Chinese Super League players
China League One players
Slovenian PrvaLiga players
FK Proleter Zrenjanin players
Red Star Belgrade footballers
First League of Serbia and Montenegro players
Expatriate footballers in Serbia and Montenegro
Expatriate footballers in Belgium
Slovenian expatriate sportspeople in Belgium
Expatriate footballers in China
Slovenian expatriate sportspeople in China
Expatriate footballers in Turkey
Slovenian expatriate sportspeople in Turkey
Expatriate footballers in Italy
Slovenian expatriate sportspeople in Italy
Slovenian expatriate footballers
NK Olimpija Ljubljana (2005) players
Slovenia international footballers